The Asian Indoor Games were a multi-sport event that was contested every two years among athletes representing countries from Asia. The games were regulated by the Olympic Council of Asia. The first games were held in 2005 in Bangkok, Thailand.

The competition consisted of indoor sports with TV broadcasting potential, a number of which are not included in the Asian Games and Winter Asian Games Programs and are not Olympic sports. The sports program included electronic sports, extreme sports, aerobics, acrobatics, indoor athletics, dance sports, futsal, inline hockey, finswimming, and 25 metres short course swimming. The 2007 Asian Indoor Games in Macau also saw the first major test of FIBA 3x3, a formalized version of three-on-three basketball that saw its official worldwide debut at the 2010 Youth Olympics. FIBA 3x3 was also contested in the 2009 Games.

Doha was given the rights to hold the fourth edition scheduled for 2011, but a year later, in June 2008, the Qatar Olympic Committee officially withdrew as host citing "unforeseen circumstances". In response, the OCA said that the 2009 Asian Indoor Games would be the last edition of the games. The Asian Indoor Games and Asian Martial Arts Games would then combine, becoming the quadrennial Asian Indoor and Martial Arts Games. The inaugural event was held in Incheon, South Korea in 2013.

List of Asian Indoor Games

Medal count

Sports

 Dragon and lion dance

References

 
Asian international sports competitions
Defunct multi-sport events
Indoor sports competitions
Multi-sport events in Asia
Olympic Council of Asia
Recurring sporting events established in 2005
Recurring sporting events disestablished in 2009